Echinostelium is a genus of slime mould, and the only genus in the monotypic family Echinosteliaceae, or Echinosteliidae. It was discovered by Heinrich Anton de Bary in 1855, apparently near Frankfurt am Main. Some species of Echinostelium have a sexual life cycle; others have been shown to be asexual. The plasmodium can divide vegetatively, in a process called plasmotomy, to distinguish it from true cell division.

Species
The genus Echinostelium comprises at least five species:
Echinostelium apitectum K. D. Whitney, 1980
Echinostelium colliculosum K. D. Whitney & H. W. Keller, 1980
Echinostelium corynophorum K. D. Whitney, 1980
Echinostelium fragile Nannenga-Bremekamp, 1961
Echinostelium minutum De Bary in Rostafinsky, 1874

References

Myxogastria
Amoebozoa genera